Valeri Valeryevich Likhobabenko (born 17 February 1976) is a Russian former professional footballer.

Club career
He made his professional debut in the Russian Third League in 1994 for FC Torgmash Lyubertsy. He played in one game in the UEFA Intertoto Cup 1997 for FC Dynamo Moscow.

Honours
 Russian Cup finalist: 2001.
 Kazakhstan Premier League champion: 2004.

References

1976 births
People from Lyubertsy
Living people
Russian footballers
Association football defenders
Association football midfielders
FC Dynamo Moscow players
FC Anzhi Makhachkala players
Russian Premier League players
FC Kairat players
Russian expatriate footballers
Expatriate footballers in Kazakhstan
Russian expatriate sportspeople in Kazakhstan
FC Veles Moscow players
Sportspeople from Moscow Oblast